Jaroslav Plíhal (30 June 1936 – 29 April 1997) was a Czech athlete. He competed in the men's shot put at the 1960 Summer Olympics.

References

External links
 

1936 births
1997 deaths
Athletes (track and field) at the 1960 Summer Olympics
Czech male shot putters
Olympic athletes of Czechoslovakia
People from Nymburk
Sportspeople from the Central Bohemian Region